Malawi is a landlocked country in southeast Africa. It is wholly within the tropics; from about 9°30S at its northernmost point to about 17°S at the southernmost tip. The country occupies a thin strip of land between Zambia and Mozambique, extending southwards into Mozambique along the valley of the Shire River. In the north and north east it also shares a border with Tanzania. Malawi is connected by rail to the Mozambican ports of Nacala and Beira. It lies between latitudes 9° and 18°S, and longitudes 32° and 36°E.

The Great Rift Valley runs through the country from north to south. Lake Malawi lies within the rift valley, making up over three-quarters of Malawi's eastern boundary. The Shire River flows down the rift valley from the south end of the lake to join the Zambezi River farther south in Mozambique. 

Plateaus and mountains lie to the east and west of the Rift Valley. The Nyika Plateau lies west of Lake Malawi in the north of the country. The Shire Highlands lie in southern Malawi, east of the rift valley and Shire River and south of Lake Malawi.

Malawi has two sites listed on the UNESCO World Heritage List. Lake Malawi National Park was first listed in 1984 and the Chongoni Rock Art Area was listed in 2006. Malawi's climate is hot in the low-lying areas in the south of the country and temperate in the northern highlands.

Geography

The Great Rift Valley traverses the country from north to south. In this deep trough lies Lake Malawi (also called Lake Nyasa), the third-largest lake in Africa, comprising about 25% of Malawi's area.

The area to the west of the lake in northern and central Malawi has been categorised by the World Wildlife Fund as part of the Central Zambezian miombo woodlands ecoregion.

The Kirk Range lies west of the Shire, and forms the border with Mozambique. In its middle stretch between Chigaru and Chikwawa, the Shire River drops almost  through  of gorges, rapids, and cataracts.

Malawi has five national parks:
Cape Maclear National Park
Kasungu National Park
Lengwe National Park
Liwonde National Park
Nyika National Park

Climate
Malawi's climate is generally tropical. The altitude moderates what would be an otherwise equatorial climate. Between November and April the temperature is warm with equatorial rains and thunderstorms, with the storms reaching their peak severity in late March. After March, the rainfall rapidly diminishes and from May to September wet mists float from the highlands into the plateaus, with almost no rainfall during these months.

Lilongwe is also hot and humid during these months, albeit far less than in the south. High altitude areas such as Mulanje and Nyika are often cold at night (around ) during June and July.

Karonga in the far north shows little variation in temperature with maximum daytime temperature remaining around  all year round but is unusual in that April and May are the wettest times of the year due to strengthening southerly winds along the lake.

Area
The land area is 94,080 km².

The country is dominated by Lake Malawi, which drains into the Zambezi River through the Shire River. As a result, the whole of the country, except for one eastern district is part of the Zambezi drainage system. Lake Chiuta and the surrounding plain is drained by the Lugenda river, which is part of the Ruvuma River drainage system. High rates of evaporation ensure that the lake seldom fills up – much of the lake is only 1 metre deep or less.

Environment — current issues:
Deforestation; land degradation; water pollution from agricultural runoff, sewage, industrial wastes; siltation of spawning grounds endangers fish populations

Environment — international agreements:
party to:
Biodiversity, Climate Change, Climate Change-Kyoto Protocol, Desertification, Endangered Species, Environmental Modification, Hazardous Wastes, Marine Life Conservation, Ozone Layer Protection, Ship Pollution, Wetlands
signed, but not ratified:
Law of the Sea

Extreme points 
This is a list of the extreme points of Malawi, the points that are farther north, south, east or west than any other location.

 Northernmost point - the tripoint with Tanzania and Zambia, Northern Region
 Easternmost point - unnamed location on the border with Mozambique immediately south-west of the Mozambican village of Buena-uzi, Southern Region
 Southernmost point - unnamed location on the border with Mozambique immediately north-east of the Mozambican village of Jossene, Southern Region
 Westernmost point - unnamed location on the border with Zambia, immediately east of the Zambian town of Chipata, Central Region

See also
 List of ecoregions in Malawi
 List of islands of Malawi

References